Deren Michael Ney is an American musician, songwriter and filmmaker from San Francisco, California. He performed with Nicki Bluhm and The Gramblers before making his solo debut in 2019 with "West Coast Mama" on Volplane Records.

A multi-instrumentalist, Guitar World editor and The Allman Brothers Band biographer Alan Paul described him as "a secret weapon."

In recent years Ney has directed music videos for Amanda Shires, Marcus King, Animal Liberation Orchestra, Jaime Wyatt and Greg Loiacono.

Biography
Ney resides in Oakland, California. 

Ney and former classmate Nicki Bluhm formed the band Nicki Bluhm and The Gramblers in San Francisco in 2008. Bluhm told The Mercury News in 2012:

“Initially, I was a solo artist. I quickly realized I didn’t like that. It was hard to cut through the noise in clubs all alone. I asked Deren to come with me.

The band's 2012 performance of Hall and Oates' I Can't Go For That (No Can Do) in their tour van amassed millions of views and introduced them to a national audience. National tours, festivals and appearances on late night shows followed. They were featured on New York Magazine's Pop Culture Matrix. The "Van Sessions" have over 10 million views on YouTube to date and count Cameron Crowe among their fans.

Ney penned the band's highest-charting radio single, "Waiting On Love".

The band has been inactive since 2017. Their final performance was at the Stern Grove Festival in their hometown of San Francisco.

Solo career

On October 18, 2019, Ney released a single "West Coast Mama" on Volplane Records. It was a surprise hit he hasn't matched with his following singles. His stable of musicians includes Tim Lefebvre (David Bowie, Tedeschi Trucks Band), Pete Levin (Gregg Allman, The Highwomen) and former Grambler bandmates Steve Adams, Dave Mulligan and Mike Curry.

As director

Ney has directed and animated several music videos for Amanda Shires, Marcus King, Animal Liberation Orchestra, Jaime Wyatt and Greg Loiacono, among others.

Discography

Solo 
 West Coast Mama, single, (Volplane Records, 2019)
 Crown Shyness (Stay Home and Get High), single, (Volplane Records, 2020)
 You Ain't Goin' Nowhere, single, (Volplane Records, 2020)
 Easy Money, single, (Volplane Records, 2021)

Nicki Bluhm and The Gramblers 
 Toby's Song (Little Knickers, 2008)
 Driftwood (Little Knickers, 2011, re-released 2012 on Little Sur Records, 2012)
 Nicki Bluhm and The Gramblers (Little Sur Records, 2013)
 Love Wild Lost (Little Sur Records, 2015)

Dave Mulligan 
 Runaway Blues (2012)

Painted Horses 
 Painted Horses (2019)

Backline

Following the suicide of guitarist Neal Casal (Chris Robinson Brotherhood, Circles Around the Sun, Ryan Adams & the Cardinals) in 2019, Ney's widely-shared remembrance of his friend helped inspire the creation of the mental health organization for musicians called Backline (though in a 2019 interview with the Jake Feinberg Show, he called his contribution minimal.)

As director

References

External links
 

Musicians from Berkeley, California
Living people
Year of birth missing (living people)
21st-century American musicians
21st-century American guitarists
Record producers from California
Singer-songwriters from California
American filmmakers
American male singer-songwriters
21st-century American male singers
21st-century American singers